Games held by the National Basketball Association (NBA) on Christmas Day, December 25, have been an annual tradition since the league's second season in 1947. Currently, five games are played on Christmas. Unlike the National Football League (NFL)'s traditional Thanksgiving Day games, the NBA's Christmas Day games have no fixed opponents; rather, they feature some of the best teams and players. Since 1995, the current NBA champions play a game on Christmas Day.

History

The first NBA game played on December 25 came in 1947, a year after the NBA's inception, when the New York Knicks beat the Providence Steamrollers at Madison Square Garden 89–75. In contrast, Major League Baseball is in its off-season during Christmas, the National Football League only schedules Christmas games when Christmas falls on the weekend (and even then only schedules games on Christmas occasionally) and the National Hockey League's collective bargaining agreement forbids playing games on Christmas Eve, Christmas Day, and Boxing Day (celebrated as such in Canada as a statutory holiday, though otherwise the non-holiday day after Christmas in the United States; in seasons in which the latter falls on a Saturday, the break occurs one day earlier, from December 23–25). In college football, the only bowl game traditionally scheduled for Christmas has been the defunct Aloha Bowl (and for one year, its replacement, the ESPN Events-owned Hawaii Bowl; that game itself moved its date specifically due to ESPN/ABC's acquisition of NBA telecasts, including Christmas Day games). Thus, the NBA is the only league to regularly schedule games on December 25.

In the early days, regional proximity dictated most of the matchups. Teams would usually play their geographical rivals to cut down on holiday travel and to allow them to have more time with their families. That was a perfect Christmas to me."

In the early 1980s, the New York Knicks put on a show three years in a row.   In one game, hall-of-fame forward Bernard King scoring 60 points—the most ever scored by a player on Christmas Day, With the advent of television and the excitement caused by these games, the NBA decided to schedule games over the holiday that showcased the best teams and players. While there is no specific system to determine for which teams will play the Christmas games, the games usually include the teams that played in the previous season's NBA Finals, as well as the team with the league's reigning MVP.

Teams and players
The Knicks have played more Christmas Day games than any other team, with 54 total. They are 23–31 on the holiday. Their most recent Yuletide appearance came in  when they defeated the Atlanta Hawks, 101–87, at Madison Square Garden. The Knicks have a checkered history on the 25th. Their 23 wins are the second most by a team on Christmas Day, while their 31 losses are the most.

The first Christmas Day game to take place outside the United States took place in 2019 when the Boston Celtics defeated the Toronto Raptors 118-102 at Scotiabank Arena in Toronto, Canada.

Some players have participated on Christmas Day as both player and coach. He won his 1,000th game on Christmas Day in 2008. LeBron James and Kobe Bryant played 16 games each on Christmas Day, tied for the most of any player.

Many teams and players that have played on this day have worn special uniforms and sneakers. From 2009 to 2011, the Knicks wore their third jersey, the green/orange alternate which they first used exclusively for St. Patrick's Day. During the game between the Heat and the Lakers in 2010, players on both teams wore holiday sneakers. Bryant, Pau Gasol and Lamar Odom wore lime-green Nike sneakers while James and Chris Bosh wore holiday-red shoes with green laces. All of these uniforms feature a particular theme, such as monochromatic designs ('Big Color') and chrome-treated logos ('Big Logo'). In  and 2016, Stance provided Christmas-themed socks for the games.

After Nike became the uniform provider in 2017, no Christmas-themed uniforms were produced. Instead, NBA teams playing on that day wore either "City" or "Statement" alternate uniforms. During the 2018–19 season, a few teams wore a fifth alternate known as "Earned" uniforms; these were given as a reward for making the 2018 NBA playoffs.

Memorable moments
The NBA Christmas Day contests have featured some of the most memorable games ever played. Bernard King scored 60 points for the New York Knicks in 1984. Patrick Ewing helped the Knicks come back to beat the Boston Celtics after trailing by 25 points in 1985.  He then beat Michael Jordan and the Bulls on a last-second jumper in 1986. Scottie Pippen performed a last-second block in 1994.

The first showdown featuring Kobe Bryant and Shaquille O'Neal as opponents occurred on Christmas, 2004. 2009 and 2010 featured faceoffs between LeBron James and Kobe Bryant. Phil Jackson becoming the fastest coach to win 1,000 games (it happened on December 25, 2008). In 2021, LeBron James became the all-time Christmas Day scorer with 422 points, surpassing Kobe Bryant, who scored 383 points.

As a result of a lockout in 2011, Christmas Day was also the season opener. ESPN/ABC analyst Jeff Van Gundy talked about that day, saying, "It's a different opening day than has ever happened in the past and Christmas Day games have always been a big day for the NBA. This unique situation combined with the unveiling of a championship banner for the Mavericks in a finals rematch, and then to see the Lakers and the debut of Mike Brown as head coach, those things are all going to be very compelling."

Rivalries have also been showcased during games played on this day. During the 1990s, every Christmas but one featured a game involving either the New York Knicks or the Chicago Bulls, with the two teams playing against each other twice (in the Bulls championship season of 1992–93 and in ). They would have met a third time in 1998, if there had not been a lockout. The only year during the 1990s in which neither team played on Christmas Day was during the Bulls first championship season in their second three-peat, in 1995–96. During the 2000s, the NBA showcased the Shaq–Kobe feud. In a great pairing, the two teams faced off against each in other during the first of the Lakers' most recent back-to-back championship seasons of 2008–09. This was the first meeting between the two teams since the finals of the year before.

The home team is 142–75 in Christmas games. The winning percentage of .654 for the home team on Christmas Day is better than the overall winning percentage for home teams during the regular season or the playoffs since .

Scheduling and broadcasting
After a season's NBA Finals comes to an end, officials from both the NBA and the network that broadcast the NBA meet to plan the schedule of games for the holiday during the upcoming season. In most cases, two of the teams that play during the holiday are the teams that reached the finals the previous season. The NBA usually tries to have the best players play against each other.

Broadcasting

The first telecast of an NBA game on Christmas Day dates back to the league's early years. In 1947, the Providence Steamrollers played in New York against the Knicks on WCBS channel 2 at 9 p.m. Eastern Time. Stan Lomax and Bob Edge called that game. Fifteen minutes later, at 8:15 p.m. Central Time, Joe Wilson broadcast the game between Baltimore Bullets and Chicago Stags for WBKB channel 4 in Chicago.

Jerry Gross and Jack Twyman called that broadcast for ABC. ABC would continue to televise Christmas Day games through . Jack Twyman remained in the color commentating position up until , when Bill Russell took over. From - (with the exception of ), CBS broadcast a game on Christmas Day.

However, it was not until  that the games became a household tradition, when CBS broadcast the game between the New Jersey Nets and the New York Knicks and ESPN broadcast the game between the Los Angeles Lakers and Portland Trail Blazers (Sam Smith and Dick Vitale were on the call for ESPN). For three years (2004–2006), ABC insisted on having a Christmas Day game between the Miami Heat and the Los Angeles Lakers so that Kobe Bryant and Shaquille O'Neal could play against each other. Since ABC took over the NBA, ESPN has also broadcast games on Christmas Day (except in 2006). Since 2009, Christmas Day broadcasts on ESPN and ABC have featured a music video with Mariah Carey singing "All I Want for Christmas Is You." In 2010, Carey added "Oh Santa!"

In , TNT broadcast on Christmas Day for the first time as Marv Albert, Mike Fratello and Craig Sager called the game between Washington and Cleveland in Cleveland and Kevin Harlan, Reggie Miller and Cheryl Miller called the game between Dallas and Portland in Portland. This marked the first time that all three networks that cover the NBA (ABC, ESPN, and TNT) produced games on Christmas Day. As Christmas Day fell on a Thursday that year, TNT was given two primetime games as part of their regular TNT NBA Thursday slate (the same scenario also took place in 2014).

Due to the 2011 NBA lockout, the season opener took place on Christmas Day that year. As a result, the NBA gave TNT the first game of the Christmas slate with a contest between the Boston Celtics and the New York Knicks at Madison Square Garden. Calling the game were Marv Albert (himself a former Knicks broadcaster) and Steve Kerr. Because of this, Albert, who was also working for CBS's NFL coverage, was forced to miss his scheduled Week 16 game the day before. Also on that day, ABC broadcast the Dallas Mavericks'  Championship banner ceremony during their pre-game show. This marked the first time in NBA history that a pre-game championship banner ceremony has been aired on a terrestrial television network; either Turner Sports or a regional sports network aired the ceremonies in previous years.

In a unique situation in 2017, ABC aired an NBA tripleheader for the first time ever, which was headlined by a 2017 NBA Finals rematch between LeBron James and the Cavaliers and Steph Curry, Kevin Durant and the Warriors, which would be the prelude to the 2018 Finals rematch, which resulted in a Warriors sweep. Because ESPN aired Monday Night Football on Christmas night, they only aired one game, which was at 12 ET. TNT aired the 10:30 pm game, the network's first Christmas Day game since 2014. However, instead of employing either Marv Albert or Kevin Harlan and their roster of game analysts, Turner opted to use the Inside the NBA crew of Ernie Johnson, Shaquille O'Neal, Kenny "The Jet" Smith and Charles Barkley for the game, with TNT's No. 2 sideline reporter Kristen Ledlow working the sidelines and halftime.

For 2022, ABC was originally scheduled to air a tripleheader. However in October 2022, ESPN announced that all five of its Christmas Day games would be simulcast across both ABC and ESPN, likely as an attempt to counterprogram the NFL's scheduling of a Christmas Day tripleheader across CBS, Fox, and NBC.

Game results

Christmas Day standings
Of current NBA teams.

Most frequent match-ups among active teams

Reception

Praise

Several fans, players, coaches, and members of the news media support the tradition of Christmas games. For players and coaches, the standard public statement is that a Christmas game is an honor, as it is not only a chance to play on national television, but also a reward for having a great team and great players.

Before the game between the Boston Celtics and Orlando Magic at Amway Arena in 2009, personnel on both sides referred to playing on Christmas as a reward. Celtics Coach Doc Rivers said that like most of the players, he always watched Christmas Day games growing up. He said, "As a kid, you wanted to be on Christmas...I tend to look at it as a reward." In 2010, added that it was an "honor" to be part of the marquee games, saying, "I look at it as a privilege. The fact that they asked us to play on Christmas means we're one of the good teams, one of the featured teams." Magic Center Dwight Howard said that he didn't "see a challenge. We're playing basketball on Christmas. We couldn't help it. If you play on a pretty good team and if you have to play on Christmas, so be it. I enjoy it. I'd rather be playing on Christmas than sitting at home wishing I was playing on Christmas. I like it. I think it's fun."

Lamar Odom called it "a tremendous privilege to be able to entertain the world...playing on TV in those games." In 2010, Knicks Coach Mike D'Antoni said that players should be "very fortunate" to be playing on Christmas Day and that "it helps the league, and...it helps other people on Christmas or on the holidays."

Doug White, an ESPN executive, said that Christmas is "Thanksgiving on the NBA side. Obviously, Christmas Day is a day when everybody is home, everybody is relaxing, and what better way to serve them than with as many games as we possibly can...We try to put on the best games possible that people have interest in." Jermaine O'Neal on the Celtics agreed, saying, "It's special because the whole world is watching. It's Christmas, it's a special day, with everybody together to spend time with each other, as far as family and friends. We have the opportunity to do that, bringing our families down with us. It makes it that much more special—the opportunity to play in front of the rest of the world and be together at Christmas with our family."

During broadcasts of NBA games, commentators and the news media have agreed with White and said that the nature of the games played has made Christmas Day the best day of an NBA regular season. They serve as a preview of a potential series in the playoffs, and perhaps, the finals.

Criticism

In recent years, players and coaches have complained about playing on Christmas Day, saying that takes time away from families. In 2009, Orlando Magic Coach Stan Van Gundy requested that the NBA do not schedule any more games on Christmas Day, saying "I actually feel sorry for people who have nothing to do on Christmas Day other than watch an NBA game" and said that the day is best spent with family. The Magic coach was fined for his comments.

In 2010, there were complaints from both sides before the game between the Miami Heat and the Los Angeles Lakers in Los Angeles. Lakers coach Phil Jackson, son of two Christian ministers and author of a book on spiritual growth related to basketball, said, "I don't think anybody should play on Christmas Day" and "it's like Christian holidays don't mean...anything any more." From the Heat, LeBron James said, "if you ask any player in the league, we'd rather be home with our families...It's not just a regular holiday. It's...one of those days that you wish you could wake up in the morning with the kids and open up presents."

Others have managed to voice some discontent while still accepting the Christmas game tradition.  Before the game between the Bulls and the Knicks in New York, Coach Mike D'Antoni said, "I can adjust a little bit. I can open my presents up at 7 o'clock at night instead of 7 o'clock in the morning." Raymond Felton said, "you'd rather be with your family. We're still going to celebrate." He, like many players, said that he was fortunate to have played with his family in attendance. Bulls Coach Tom Thibodeau said, "I think it's an honor and a privilege to be playing. I know it's tough on the away team, particularly the players who have kids. But that's all part of it." Derrick Rose said, "I'm going to miss my family, and I hate being away from home. But this is my job and it's an honor to be playing on Christmas."

In 2004, the NBA was criticized for scheduling a game between the Detroit Pistons and Indiana Pacers. It was the first time since their brawl that the two teams had faced each other. Such a pairing was unintentional, as the regular season was scheduled before the brawl took place. The other game scheduled that day drew similar criticism.  The game between the Miami Heat and Los Angeles Lakers at Staples Center marked the first time since the Lakers traded Shaquille O'Neal to the Heat that the two teams were facing each other and the first time that Shaq and Kobe Bryant would be facing each other as opponents.

The NBA does not schedule games on Christmas Eve, December 24, to allow players and coaches who have to play on Christmas Day to be with their families. Also families of players and coaches who participate in Christmas games, normally attend the games.

Television ratings

The NBA's Christmas games have garnered some of the highest ratings for any televised regular season NBA game. The TV ratings for the biggest Christmas games are often higher than any NBA game outside of the NBA Finals, and for many U.S. sports fans, Christmas serves as an unofficial "start" to the NBA season; the usual start of the NBA season occurs under relatively little fanfare compared to the NFL or MLB, as those leagues are at the most consequential points of their seasons.

Notes

References

Bibliography

Christmas Day
Christmas events and celebrations
1946 establishments in the United States
Christmas in the United States